Tito is a 2010 Croatian documentary miniseries about Yugoslav leader Josip Broz Tito. The first episode aired March 19, 2010.

The series is a co-production by Croatian Radiotelevision and Mediteran film. The two first collaborated on the series Long Dark Night, which at a top audience of 1.8 million viewers was one of the most-watched domestic productions in history. After the announcement of the documentary, Tito's granddaughter Saša Broz announced that she and her family would use all means possible to obstruct filming. Tito cost a reported 1 million euros to make.

Cast
Boris Svrtan as Josip Broz Tito
 Ivo Gregurević as Joseph Stalin
 Goran Višnjić as Andrija Hebrang
Mirjana Rogina as Jovanka Broz
 Goran Grgić as Alojzije Stepinac
Goran Navojec as Fyodor Tolbukhin
 Nataša Janjić as Olga Hebrang

Reception
The first episode of Tito was seen by 800,000 viewers, recording a rating of 22.6 and a share of 49.9. However, the number of viewers dropped sharply thereafter, and the 11th episode had a rating of just 8.3.

The series was criticized for alleged numerous factual errors, distortions and omissions, lack of originality, and badly executed dramatizations.

References

External links
 

2010 Croatian television series debuts
2010 Croatian television series endings
Croatian television series
2010s documentary television series
Documentary films about politicians
2010s television miniseries
Croatian television miniseries
Cultural depictions of Josip Broz Tito
Cultural depictions of Joseph Stalin
Croatian Radiotelevision original programming